2001 in Korea may refer to:
2001 in North Korea
2001 in South Korea